The Dovells were an American doo-wop group, formed at Overbrook High School in Philadelphia, Pennsylvania, in 1957, under the name 'The Brooktones'. The original members were Arnie Silver, Len Borisoff, Jerry Gross (alias Summers), Mike Freda, and Jim Mealey (alias Danny Brooks). Their first single "No, No, No" was a local hit for The Brooktones.

Parkway Records Era 
Gross left the Brooktones in 1959 to form the group The Gems with Jerry Gross, Mark Stevens, Mike Freda, Warren Purdy, and Roland Scarinci. The remaining Brooktones signed to Parkway Records in 1960 and added Jerry Sirlen and William Shunkwiler to the group, while changing the band's name to The Dovells. While rehearsing "Out in the Cold Again", which turned out to be the B-side of "Bristol Stomp", Len called Jerry and asked for help with the harmonies. After two days of trying, Len asked Jerry to be part of the group and replace two of the other members. Sirlen and Shunkwiler were replaced by Gross and Freda. Mark went on to start his own group Tony & the Raindrops ("Our Love is Over", a local hit), and later joined The Dovells in the 1960s. Warren Purdy went to work for The Boeing Company.  Roland Scarinci enlisted in The Marine Corps then went on to work for AT&T.

The Dovells at that point (1961) were Len Borisoff (aka Len Barry), Gross, Silver, Mealey, and Freda, which went on to record eight hit records, starting with the "Bristol Stomp". Mealey left the group in 1962 for personal reasons, but still did some recordings with them.

The Dovells first national hit was "Bristol Stomp", a dance song. This was followed by the similar hit "Do the New Continental" (featured in the John Waters movie Hairspray for a minute). "Bristol Stomp" sold over one million copies, and was awarded a gold disc. They appeared performing both songs in the Chubby Checker movie Don't Knock The Twist in 1961. They released a series of singles over the next few years. These included "You Can't Sit Down", a top hit on the Billboard Hot 100 in 1963. Len left at the end of 1963 for a solo career under the name Len Barry. The high point of his solo career was the Top 5 smash "1-2-3" in 1965, and the follow up hit "Like a Baby".

The Dovells released "If You Wanna Be Happy" on the album You Can't Sit Down in 1963. The song was previously released by Jimmy Soul earlier that year and based on the song "Ugly Woman" by Roaring Lion.
 
In 1963, American Bandstand signed the band to Dick Clark's Caravan of Stars national U.S. tour which was scheduled to perform its 15th show on the night of November 22, 1963 at the Memorial Auditorium in Dallas, Texas until suddenly the Friday evening event had to be cancelled moments after U.S. President John F. Kennedy was assassinated that afternoon while touring Dallas in an open car caravan.

The Magistrates and later years 
The Dovells continued as a trio, and recorded as The Magistrates for MGM in 1968. As the Magistrates, they recorded the chart hit "Here Comes the Judge," taking advantage of the popularity of the skit on the TV show Laugh-In. Gross and Freda wrote and produced the song, added the female voice of Jean Yost (Hillary), and performed as The Magistrates as well as The Dovells. Freda left to do his own thing in 1969. The Dovells (Gross-Silver-Stevens) went on to be a big hit, in Las Vegas and the Night Club circuit around the country, doing over 300 shows a year.

Steve van Zandt, “Miami Steve” at the time, was in the band in the early ‘70s. 

In 1975, Silver was tired of being on the road and left the group. Gross and Stevens went on as a duo to great reviews for their music and comedy, and continue to perform to this day.

The Dovells performed at both of President Bill Clinton's inaugural balls, with Clinton guest appearing on saxophone. In 1991, Len Barry reunited with The Dovells twice. He died in a Philadelphia hospital of myelodysplasia, a bone marrow disease, on November 20, 2020. He was 78 years old.

Singles

References

External links
 Classicbands.com
 Biography
  Cameo Parkway history, pictures, lists

Musical groups from Pennsylvania
Musical groups from Philadelphia
Musical groups established in 1958
Jamie Records artists
Cameo Records artists
1958 establishments in Pennsylvania